Puka Urqu (Quechua puka red, urqu mountain, "red mountain",  also spelled Pucaorjo, Puka Orqo) is a mountain in the Andes of Peru, about  high, with an archaeological site of that name on the mountaintop. It is situated in the Ayacucho Region, Lucanas Province, San Cristóbal District, north of San Cristóbal. Puka Urqu lies northwest of the archaeological site of Ñawpallaqta.

References 

Mountains of Peru
Mountains of Ayacucho Region
Archaeological sites in Peru
Archaeological sites in Ayacucho Region